The Russia men's national artistic gymnastics team represents Russia in FIG international competitions.  Additionally they have competed as the Russian Olympic Committee (ROC) and the Russian Gymnastics Federation (RGF) due to the World Anti-Doping Agency banning athletes from representing Russia in international competition.

After the 2022 Russian invasion of Ukraine, the International Gymnastics Federation (FIG) barred Russian athletes and officials, including judges. It also announced that "all FIG World Cup and World Challenge Cup events planned to take place in Russia ... are cancelled, and no other FIG events will be allocated to Russia ... until further notice." FIG also banned the Russian flag at its events. European Gymnastics announced in March 2022 that no athletes, officials, and judges from the Russian Gymnastics Federation can participate in any European Gymnastics events, that no European Gymnastics authorities from Russias can pursue their functions, and that European Gymnastics had removed from its calendar all events allocated to Russia and would not allocate any future events to Russia.

History
Russia has made seven appearances in the men's team competition at the Olympic Games and has won four medals.  They won gold twice – first at their debut in 1996 and then again in 2020.

After the 2022 Russian invasion of Ukraine, the International Gymnastics Federation (FIG) barred Russian athletes and officials, including judges. It also announced that "all FIG World Cup and World Challenge Cup events planned to take place in Russia ... are cancelled, and no other FIG events will be allocated to Russia ... until further notice." FIG also banned the Russian flag at its events.

2023 senior roster

2023 Junior roster

Team competition results

Olympic Games
 1928 through 1992 — participated as the Soviet Union
 1996 —  gold medal
 Alexei Nemov, Alexei Voropaev, Yevgeni Podgorny, Dmitri Vasilenko, Sergei Kharkov, Nikolai Kryukov, Dmitri Trush
 2000 —  bronze medal
 Alexei Nemov, Maxim Aleshin, Alexei Bondarenko, Nikolai Kryukov, Yevgeni Podgorny, Dmitri Drevin
 2004 — 6th place
 Aleksei Bondarenko, Maxim Deviatovski, Anton Golotsutskov, Georgi Grebenkov, Aleksei Nemov, Aleksander Safoshkin
 2008 — 6th place
 Maxim Devyatovsky, Anton Golotsutskov, Sergei Khorokhordin, Nikolai Kryukov, Konstantin Pluzhnikov, Yuri Ryazanov
 2012 — 6th place
 Denis Ablyazin, Aleksandr Balandin, David Belyavskiy, Emin Garibov, Igor Pakhomenko
 2016 —  silver medal
 Denis Ablyazin, David Belyavskiy, Ivan Stretovich, Nikolai Kuksenkov, Nikita Nagornyy
 2020 —  gold medal – participated as the Russian Olympic Committee
 Denis Ablyazin, David Belyavskiy, Artur Dalaloyan, Nikita Nagornyy

World Championships

 1934 through 1991 — participated as the Soviet Union
 1994 —  silver medal
 Evgeni Chabaev, Evgeni Joukov, Dmitri Karbanenko, Alexei Nemov, Dmitri Trush, Dmitri Vasilenko, Alexei Voropaev
 1995 — 4th place
 Dmitri Karbanenko, Evgeni Chabaev, Alexei Voropaev, Alexei Nemov, Dmitri Vasilenko, Evgeni Podgorni
 1997 —  bronze medal
 Dmitri Vasilenko, Alexei Bondarenko, Alexei Voropaev, Alexei Nemov, Evgeni Ghukov, Nikolai Kryukov
 1999 —  silver medal
 Alexei Bondarenko, Nikolai Kryukov, Alexei Nemov, Maxim Aleshin, Rashid Kasumov, Evgeni Podgorni
 2001 — 7th place
 Alexei Bondarenko, Alexei Nemov, Georgy Grebenkov, Evgeny Krylov, Nikolai Kryukov, Yury Tikhonovsky
 2003 — 4th place
 Alexei Bondarenko, Alexei Nemov, Anton Golotsutskov, Evgeny Podgorny, Nikolai Kryukov
 2006 —  silver medal
 Maxim Deviatovski, Dimitri Gogotov, Sergei Khorokhordin, Nikolai Kryukov, Yury Ryazanov, Alexander Safoshkin
 2007 — 7th place
 Yuri Ryazanov, Sergei Khorokhordin, Maxim Devyatovsky, Nikolai Kryukov, Alexander Safoshkin
 2010 — 6th place
 Sergey Khorokhordin, Maxim Devyatovskiy, David Belyavskiy, Anton Golotsutskov, Igor Pakhomenko, Andrey Cherkasov
 2011 — 4th place
 Konstantin Pluzhnikov, Emin Garibov, Sergei Khorokhordin, David Belyavskiy, Denis Ablyazin, Anton Golotsutskov
 2014 — 5th place
 Denis Ablyazin, David Belyavskiy, Nikita Ignatyev, Daniil Kazachkov, Nikolai Kuksenkov, Ivan Stretovich
 2015 – 4th place
 Denis Ablyazin, David Belyavskiy, Nikita Ignatyev, Nikolai Kuksenkov, Nikita Nagornyy, Ivan Stretovich
 2018 —  silver medal
 David Belyavskiy, Artur Dalaloyan, Nikolai Kuksenkov, Dmitrii Lankin, Nikita Nagornyy, Vladislav Polyashov
 2019 —  gold medal
 Denis Ablyazin, David Belyavskiy, Artur Dalaloyan, Nikita Nagornyy, Ivan Stretovich, Vladislav Polyashov

Junior World Championships
 2019 — 9th place
 Kirill Gashkov, Ivan Gerget, Ivan Kuliak

Most decorated gymnasts
This list includes all Russian male artistic gymnasts who have won at least four medals at the Olympic Games and the World Artistic Gymnastics Championships combined.  Not included are medals won as part of the Soviet Union or Unified Teams.

See also  
Round Lake (gymnastics)
 Russia women's national gymnastics team
 List of Olympic male artistic gymnasts for Russia

References 

Gymnastics in Russia
National men's artistic gymnastics teams
Gymnastics